Jacques Rancière (born 10 June 1940) is a French philosopher, Professor of Philosophy at European Graduate School in Saas-Fee and Emeritus Professor of Philosophy at the University of Paris VIII: Vincennes—Saint-Denis. After co-authoring Reading Capital (1965) with the structuralist Marxist philosopher Louis Althusser and others, and after witnessing the 1968 political uprisings his work turned against Althusserian Marxism, he later came to develop an original body of work focused on aesthetics.

Life and work
Rancière contributed to the influential volume Reading Capital before publicly breaking with Althusser over his attitude toward the May 1968 student uprising in Paris; Rancière felt Althusser's theoretical stance did not leave enough room for spontaneous popular uprising.

Since then, Rancière has departed from the path set by his teacher and published a series of works probing the concepts that make up our understanding of political discourse, such as ideology and proletariat. He sought to address whether the working class in fact exists, and how the masses of workers that thinkers like Althusser referred to continuously enter into a relationship with knowledge, particularly the limits of philosophers' knowledge with respect to the proletariat. An example of this line of thinking is Rancière's book entitled Le philosophe et ses pauvres (The Philosopher and His Poor, 1983), a book about the role of the poor in the intellectual lives of philosophers.

From 1975 to 1981, Rancière was a figurehead for the Journal Les Révoltes Logiques. Forming partly out of a philosophy seminar on Workers’ history that Rancière gave at Vincennes, it drew together philosophers and historians for a radical political intervention into French thought after the May 1968 uprisings. Its title acting as both a reference to Arthur Rimbaud’s poem, Democratie (‘Nous Massacrerons les revoltes logiques’ – ‘We'll smash all logic revolts.’) and the Maoist Cultural Revolutionary slogan adopted by the Gauche Prolétarienne group, of which some of Les Rèvoltes Logiques''' members were active within, ‘On a raison de se revolter’ – ‘It is right to revolt.’, the Journal attempted to interrogate and contest the historiographic and political norms around the representation of workers’ and social history. Writing, along with figures like feminist historian Genevieve Fraisse, Rancière and others attempted to reveal the complexity, contradictions and diversity of ‘thought and history from below’. In its fifteen ordinary issues, the collective wished to overcome the historiographic norms in which the working class were given historical treatment but rendered voiceless, homogeneous and pre-theoretical; instead, they allowed workers to speak for themselves, and interrogated their words seriously.

More recently Rancière has written on the topic of human rights and specifically the role of international human rights organizations in asserting the authority to determine which groups of people, again the problem of masses, justify human rights interventions and even war.

Rancière's book, The Ignorant Schoolmaster: Five Lessons in Intellectual Emancipation (original title Le Maître ignorant: Cinq leçons sur l'émancipation intellectuelle, published in 1987) was written for educators and educators-to-be.  Through the story of Joseph Jacotot, Rancière challenges his readers to consider equality as a starting point rather than a destination.  In doing so, he asks educators to abandon the themes and rhetoric of cultural deficiency and salvation. Rather than requiring informed schoolmasters to guide students towards prescribed and alienating ends, Rancière argues that educators can channel the equal intelligence in all to facilitate their intellectual growth in virtually unlimited directions. The schoolmaster need not know anything (and may be ignorant). Rancière begins with the premises that all are of equal intelligence and that any collective educational exercise founded on this principle can provide the insights from which knowledge is constructed. He claims that the poor and disenfranchised should feel perfectly able to teach themselves whatever it is they want to know. Furthermore, anyone can lead, and the oppressed should not feel bound to experts or reliant on others for their intellectual emancipation.

Jacotot advocated the 'equality of intelligence' and claimed that an ignorant person could teach another ignorant person. Rancière developed this idea in The Ignorant Schoolmaster, saying that “there is stultification whenever one intelligence is subordinated to another ... whoever teaches without emancipating stultifies”.

 Political philosophy 

 Basic concepts 
Rancière's philosophy is radically anti-elitist and aggressively anti-authoritarian, his mature philosophy primarily distinguished by his proposal to obliterate the distinction between aesthetics and politics. Gabriel Rockhill published an English glossary of Rancière's technical terms in 2004 as Appendix I to the English translation of Rancière's The Politics of Aesthetics with cross references to their explication in Rancière's major works. This glossary includes key terms in Rancière's philosophy that either he invented or uses in a radically different manner than their common usages elsewhere such as aesthetic regime, aesthetic unconscious, archi-politics, Community of Equals, demos, dissensus, distribution of the sensible, emancipation, the ethical regime of images, literarity, meta-politics, ochlos, para-politics, partition of the sensible, police order, the poetics of knowledge, post-democracy, regimes of art, silent speech, and le tort.Rancière's political philosophy is characterized by a number of key concepts: politics, disagreement, police, equality, post-democracy:

 Politics — an activity the subject of which is equality.
 Disagreement — an insurmountable conflict between people, which is inherent in human nature and manifests itself in a speech situation when one of the interlocutors understands and does not understand the other at the same time.
 Police — a symbolic ordering of the social, aimed at determining the share of participation or lack of participation in each part. The concept goes back to the work of Michel Foucault in the 1970s.
 Equality — a set of practices aimed at certifying the equality of anyone with anyone.
 Post-democracy — consensus system of modernity based on the identity (full compliance) of society and the individual and the consideration of society as the sum of its parts.

 Influence 
In 2006, it was reported that Rancière's aesthetic theory had become a point of reference in the visual arts, and Rancière has lectured at such art world events as the Frieze Art Fair. Former French presidential candidate Ségolène Royal described Rancière as her favourite philosopher. Among those intellectuals influenced by his work, Gabriel Rockhill, the editor and translator into English of Rancière's The Politics of Aesthetics, has developed a new paradigm for thinking about the historical relation between aesthetics and politics in close dialogue with Rancière's writings.

The literary critic Rita Felski has named Rancière as an important precursor to the project of postcritique within literary studies.

Selected bibliography

Rancière's work in English translationReading Capital (1968) (with Louis Althusser, Roger Establet, Pierre Macherey and Étienne Balibar in the French original edition)
 “Reply to Levy”. Telos 33 (Fall 1977). New York: Telos Press.
 The Nights of Labor: The Workers' Dream in Nineteenth-Century France (1989) .
 The Ignorant Schoolmaster: Five Lessons in Intellectual Emancipation (1987, tr. 1991) - .
 The Names of History: On the Poetics of Knowledge (1994) - This is a brief book, arguing for an epistemological critique of the methods and goals of the traditional study of history.  It has been influential in the philosophy of history
 On the Shores of Politics (1995): 
 Disagreement: Politics and Philosophy (1998) .
 Short Voyages to the Land of the People (2003): 
 The Politics of Aesthetics: The Distribution of the Sensible, ed. and transl. by Gabriel Rockhill (2004): 
 The Philosopher and His Poor, ed. Andrew Parker, co-trans. John Drury, Corinne Oster, and Andrew Parker (2004): The Future of the Image (2007): Hatred of Democracy (2007): The Aesthetic Unconscious (2009), transl., Debra Keates & James Swenson:  The Emancipated Spectator (2010): Dissensus: On Politics and Aesthetics (2010): Chronicles of Consensual Times (2010), tr. by Steven Corcoran: The Politics of Literature (2011), tr. by Julie Rose:  Staging the People: The Proletarian and His Double (2011), tr. by David Fernbach:  Althusser's Lesson (2011) - The first English translation of Rancière's first book, in which he explores and begins to move beyond the thought of his mentor, Louis Althusser (tr. by Emiliano Battista) Mute Speech: Literature, Critical Theory, and Politics (2011), tr. by James Swenson: Mallarmé: The Politics of the Siren (2011), tr. by Steven Corcoran:  Aisthesis: Scenes from the Aesthetic Regime of Art (2013), tr. by Zakir Paul: Bela Tarr, the Time After (2013), tr. by Erik Beranek: 
 Modern Times (2017) :  - 4 essays on temporality in art and politics, originally written in English
 "A coffee with Jacques Rancière Beneath the Acropolis" (2018), BabyloniaSelected articles in English
 "Ten Theses on Politics Theory & Event 2001
"Who Is the Subject of the Rights of Man?" The South Atlantic Quarterly, Volume 103, Number 2/3, Spring/Summer 2004, pp. 297–310
"Is there a Deleuzian Aesthetics?" Tr. Radmila Djordjevic, Qui Parle?, Volume 14, Number 2, 2004, pp. 1–14
"The Thread of the Novel" Novel: A Forum on Fiction, Volume 47, Number 2, 2014, pp. 196–209

 Films 
 Marx Reloaded, Arte, April 2011.

 Video lectures 
 Jacques Rancière. . Pacific Northwest College of Art. Portland, Oregon, February 29, 2008.
 Jacques Rancière. . Sarai Centre for the Centre for the Study of Developing Societies (CSDS). Video Lecture. February 6, 2009.
 Jacques Rancière. "Negation and Cinematic Vertigo." European Graduate School. Video Lecture. August 2009.
 Jacques Rancière. . Ohio State University. Video Lecture. September 21, 2017.

 Interviews 
 "An Interview with Jacques Rancière: Playing Freely, from the Other, to the Letter" interviewed by Joseph R. Shafer, in SubStance, 2021.
 "Representation Against Democracy" Jacques Rancière on the French Presidential Elections, 2017
 "We Are Always Ignorant of our own Effects" , Jacques Rancière interviewed by Pablo Bustinduy, in The Conversant, 2013
 "Democracy Means Equality", interview in Radical Philosophy Politics and Aesthetics, Jacques Ranciere interviewed by Peter Hallward, 2003
 Eurozine interview with Ranciere, 2006 
 "Art Is Going Elsewhere. And Politics Has to Catch It", Jacques Rancière interviewed by Sudeep Dasgupta, 2008
 'The Politics of Aesthetics': Jacques Rancière Interviewed by Nicolas Vieillescazes  this interview piece was first posted: 12-01-09 at the website of Naked Punch
 Jacques Rancière interviewed by Rye Dag Holmboe for The White Review
 "Aesthetics against Incarnation:  An Interview by Anne Marie Oliver," Critical Inquiry, 2008
 "Jean-Luc Godard, La religion de l'art. Entretien avec Jacques Rancière" paru dans CinémAction, « Où en est le God-Art ? », n° 109, 2003, pp. 106–112, reproduit sur le site d'analyse L'oBservatoire (simple appareil).

 References 

Further readingThe Lessons of Rancière. Samuel A. Chambers. (New York: Oxford University Press, 2013).Jacques Rancière: An Introduction, by Joseph Tanke. (New York & London: Continuum, 2011).Jacques Rancière: Politics, History, Aesthetics. Eds. Phil Watts and Gabriel Rockhill. (Durham & London: Duke University Press, 2009). Also includes an afterword by Rancière: "The Method of Equality: An Answer to Some Questions".Politica delle immagini. Su Jacques Rancière, ed. by Roberto De Gaetano (Cosenza: Pellegrini, 2011). Includes essays by Rancière.The Political Thought of Jacques Rancière. Todd May (Edinburgh: Edinburgh University Press, 2008). Rancière's Sentiments. Davide Panagia (Durham: Duke University Press, 2018).  Jacques Rancière: Key Concepts. Ed. Jean-Phillipe Deranty (Durham: Acumen, 2010).Jacques Rancière: Education, Truth, Emancipation. Charles Bingham and Gert Biesta (London & New York: Continuum, 2010). Also includes an essay by Rancière: "On Ignorant Schoolmasters".

 External links 

 Jacques Rancière: Democracy, Equality, Emancipation in a Changing World at B-FEST (International Antiauthoritarian Festival of Babylonia Journal) 27/05/17, Athens
 Jacques Rancière Faculty Page at European Graduate School
 With and Around Jacques Rancière. Art and Research. Volume 2. No. 1. Summer 2008
 Thomas Campbell. Rancière's Lessons.
 Ben Davis. Jacques Rancière, The Politics of Aesthetics. artnet. Book Review. August 17, 2006.
 Audio Recordings of guest lectures given at U.C. Berkeley. February/March 2008
 Luka Arsenjuk. On Jacques Rancière . Eurozine, 1 March 2007
 Eli Bornowsky. Notes on the Politics of Aesthetics. Fillip. Book Review. 2006
 Juha Suoranta (2010). Jacques Rancière on Radical Equality and Adult Education . The Encyclopaedia of Philosophy of Education  "Jacques Rancière, l'indiscipliné" . A special issue of the journal Labyrinthe'', 2004 (in French)
 Rancières view on Marx: The big bird promotes inequality . Katapult-Magazine. 11.05.2015
 Peter Graton. Critical review of Rancière's Aisthesis Book review. 2014.

1940 births
Living people
People from Algiers
École Normale Supérieure alumni
Academic staff of European Graduate School
Academic staff of the University of Paris
Academic staff of Paris 8 University Vincennes-Saint-Denis
French literary critics
French communists
Philosophers of art
Poststructuralists
Marxist theorists
20th-century French philosophers
21st-century French philosophers
21st-century French writers
French male writers
Continental philosophers
Commandeurs of the Ordre des Arts et des Lettres